Hebah Patel (born 6 January 1989) is an Indian actress who predominantly appears in Telugu films. After working as a model, Patel made her acting debut with the Kannada film Adyaksha and then made her Tamil film debut Thirumanam Enum Nikkah both (2014).  

Patel made her Telugu film debut with Ala Ela (2014) and received critical acclaim for her role in Kumari 21F (2015). She received Best Debut Actress – Telugu at the Santosham Film Awards for her performance in both these films. Her notable work include Eedo Rakam Aado Rakam, Ekkadiki Pothavu Chinnavada both (2016), Andhhagadu, Angel both (2017) and 24 Kisses (2018). She made her web debut with Mastis (2020).

Early life
Patel was born on 6 January 1989 in Mumbai, Maharashta. She belong to a Kannada-speaking Muslim family, but people mistake her to be a Gujarati, due to her last name. She completed her graduation from Sophia College for Women, Mumbai.

Career

Debut and breakthrough (2014–2015) 
Patel made her acting debut with the 2014 Kannada film Adyaksha, appearing as Aishwarya, and also marking her Kannada film debut.  She had her Tamil debut with Thirumanam Enum Nikkah playing Naseema, a critically successful film and Telugu film debut with Ala Ela, where she was seen as Shruti, in the same year.

Hebah had her breakthrough with the role of Meena "Kumari" in the coming-of-age love story Kumari 21F with Raj Tarun. It released in 2015 to positive reviews for her performance. A reviewer for the Deccan Chronicle wrote that Patel "steals the show" in the film.

Various roles and success (2016–2018) 
Patel had a successful year, in 2016 with 3 releases. She was first seen as Supriya in Eedo Rakam Aado Rakam alongside Raj Tarun, which received praises for its comic content. She next appeared as Nithya / Amala in Ekkadiki Pothavu Chinnavada opposite Nikhil Siddharth, it was a critical and commercial success. Her final film of the year was Naanna Nenu Naa Boyfriends, where she was seen as Padmavati / Paddu, it was a female-oriented film.

Hebah again had 3 releases in 2017, with Mister being the first release, she was seen as Meera opposite Varun Tej. It received mixed reviews. She appeared as Dr. Netra in her next film Andhhagadu, pairing with her frequent co-star Raj Tarun. It was a critical and commercial success. Her final release of the year was Angel with Naga Anvesh, where she was seen as Nakshatra.

In 2018, her only film was 24 Kisses with Adith Arun. It saw her playing Sri Lakshmi and received mixed to positive reviews.

Setback and resurgence (2019–present) 
Patel's setback started in 2019, when she had no release. In 2020, she portrayed a cameo character of Sarah in Bheeshma and supporting character of Srujana in Orey Bujjiga. Meanwhile, in 2020, she made her web debut with the Telugu series Masti's, portraying Tanya.

In 2021, Hebah appeared in a special appearance in the song "Dinchak" along with Ram Pothineni in Red.

Hebah's upcoming films include Telugu films Geetha with Sunil and Telisinavaallu with Ram Karthik. She also has Tamil films Vallan with Sundar C., which marks her return to Tamil cinema after 8 years and Aadya.

Filmography

Films

Web series

Awards and nominations

References

External links

Living people
Indian film actresses
21st-century Indian actresses
Actresses in Tamil cinema
Actresses in Telugu cinema
Actresses in Kannada cinema
Actresses from Mumbai
Santosham Film Awards winners
1989 births